= Joint Statement on Afghanistan Evacuation Travel Assurances =

Afghanistan Countries joined the Joint Declaration

Joint Statement on Afghanistan Evacuation Travel Assurances is a statement issued on August 29, 2021 by 94 countries around the world stating that they had “received assurances from the Taliban” that all foreign nationals and any Afghan citizen with travel documents showing they were clear to enter any of those countries could safely depart. Also, the statement said the countries would continue to issue travel documents to designated Afghans. This is supposed to allow a safe passage after the 31 August deadline for withdrawal of US forces from Afghanistan.
